The Biotech and MCV District is the community that surrounds the MCV Campus of Virginia Commonwealth University in Downtown Richmond, Virginia.

See also 
 Neighborhoods of Richmond, Virginia
 Richmond, Virginia
 Virginia Commonwealth University

References

External links 
 View of Biotech & MCV District

Neighborhoods in Richmond, Virginia